This is a list of species of fruit flies (Tephritidae) in the genus Bactrocera, as of 2019.

 Bactrocera abbreviata (Hardy, 1974)
 Bactrocera abdofuscata (Drew, 1971)
 Bactrocera abdolonginqua (Drew, 1971)
 Bactrocera abdomininigra Drew, 1989
 Bactrocera abdonigella (Drew, 1866)
 Bactrocera aberrans (Hardy, 1951)
 Bactrocera abscondita (Drew & Hancock, 1981)
 Bactrocera absidata Drew, 1989
 Bactrocera abundans Drew, 1989
 Bactrocera aceraglans White & Evenhuis, 1999
 Bactrocera aceromata White & Evenhuis, 1999
 Bactrocera adamantea Leblanc & Doorenweerd, 2018
 Bactrocera aemula Drew, 1989
 Bactrocera aenigmatica (Malloch, 1931)
 Bactrocera aeroginosa (Drew & Hancock, 1981)
 Bactrocera aethriobasis (Hardy, 1973)
 Bactrocera affinibancroftii Drew & Romig, 2013
 Bactrocera affinidorsalis (Hardy, 1982)
 Bactrocera affinis (Hardy, 1954)
 Bactrocera aglaiae (Hardy, 1951)
 Bactrocera aithogaster Drew, 1989
 Bactrocera albistrigata (Meijere, 1911)
 Bactrocera allwoodi (Drew, 1979)
 Bactrocera alyxiae (May, 1953)
 Bactrocera amarambalensis Drew, 2002
 Bactrocera ampla (Drew, 1971)
 Bactrocera amplexa (Munro, 1984)
 Bactrocera amplexiseta (May, 1962)
 Bactrocera andamanensis (Kapoor, 1971)
 Bactrocera anfracta Drew, 1989
 Bactrocera angusticostata Drew, 1989
 Bactrocera angustifasciata Drew, 1989
 Bactrocera anomala (Drew, 1971)
 Bactrocera anthracina (Drew, 1971)
 Bactrocera antigone (Drew & Hancock, 1981)
 Bactrocera apicofuscans White & Tsuruta, 2001
 Bactrocera apiconigroscutella Drew, 2002
 Bactrocera apicopicta Drew & Romig, 2013
 Bactrocera aquila (Drew, 1989)
 Bactrocera aquilonis (May, 1965)
 Bactrocera arecae (Hardy & Adachi, 1954)
 Bactrocera assita Drew, 1989
 Bactrocera aterrima (Drew, 1972)
 Bactrocera atra (Malloch, 1938)
 Bactrocera atrabifasciata Drew & Romig, 2001
 Bactrocera atramentata (Hering, 1941)
 Bactrocera atrifemur Drew & Hancock, 1994
 Bactrocera atriliniellata Drew, 1989
 Bactrocera aurantiaca (Drew & Hancock, 1981)
 Bactrocera aurea (May, 1952)
 Bactrocera avittata Drew & Romig, 2013
 Bactrocera balagawii Drew, 2011
 Bactrocera bancroftii (Tryon, 1927)
 Bactrocera banneri White, 1999
 Bactrocera barringtoniae (Tryon, 1927)
 Bactrocera batemani Drew, 1989
 Bactrocera beckerae (Hardy, 1982)
 Bactrocera bellisi Drew & Romig, 2013
 Bactrocera bhutaniae Drew & Romig, 2013
 Bactrocera biarcuata (Walker, 1865)
 Bactrocera bidentata (May, 1963)
 Bactrocera bifasciata (Hardy, 1982)
 Bactrocera biguttata (Bezzi, 1922)
 Bactrocera bimaculata Drew & Hancock, 1994
 Bactrocera binhduongiae Drew & Romig, 2013
 Bactrocera bipustulata Bezzi, 1914
 Bactrocera bitungiae Drew & Romig, 2013
 Bactrocera bivittata Lin & Wang, 2005
 Bactrocera blairiae Drew & Romig, 2013
 Bactrocera brachycera (Bezzi, 1916)
 Bactrocera breviaculeus (Hardy, 1951)
 Bactrocera brevistriata (Drew, 1968)
 Bactrocera bruneiae Drew & Romig, 2013
 Bactrocera brunnea (Perkins & May, 1949)
 Bactrocera brunneola White & Tsuruta, 2001
 Bactrocera bryoniae (Tryon, 1927)
 Bactrocera buinensis Drew, 1989
 Bactrocera bullata Drew, 1989
 Bactrocera bullifera (Hardy, 1973)
 Bactrocera buloloensis Drew, 1989
 Bactrocera cacuminata (Hering, 1941)
 Bactrocera caledoniensis Drew, 1989
 Bactrocera caliginosa (Hardy, 1970)
 Bactrocera calophylli (Perkins & May, 1949)
 Bactrocera captiva Drew & Romig, 2013
 Bactrocera carambolae Drew & Hancock, 1994
 Bactrocera carbonaria (Hendel, 1927)
 Bactrocera careofascia Drew & Romig, 2013
 Bactrocera caryeae (Kapoor, 1971)
 Bactrocera ceylanica Tsuruta & White, 2001
 Bactrocera cheesmanae (Perkins, 1939)
 Bactrocera chettalli David & Ranganath, 2016
 Bactrocera cibodasae Drew & Hancock, 1994
 Bactrocera cinnabaria Drew & Romig, 2013
 Bactrocera cinnamea Drew, 1989
 Bactrocera circamusae Drew, 1989
 Bactrocera citima (Hardy, 1973)
 Bactrocera clarifemur Leblanc & Doorenweerd, 2018
 Bactrocera cogani White 2006
 Bactrocera cognata (Hardy & Adachi, 1954)
 Bactrocera collita Drew & Hancock, 1994
 Bactrocera commensurata Drew & Romig, 2013
 Bactrocera commina Drew, 1989
 Bactrocera confluens (Drew, 1971)
 Bactrocera congener Drew, 1989
 Bactrocera connecta Leblanc & Doorenweerd, 2018
 Bactrocera consectorata Drew, 1989
 Bactrocera contermina Drew, 1989
 Bactrocera contigua Drew, 1989
 Bactrocera continua (Bezzi, 1919)
 Bactrocera coracina (Drew, 1971)
 Bactrocera correcta (Bezzi, 1916)
 Bactrocera costalis (Shiraki, 1933)
 Bactrocera curreyi Drew, 1989
 Bactrocera curtivitta Drew & Romig, 2013
 Bactrocera curvifer (Walker, 1864)
 Bactrocera curvipennis (Froggatt, 1909)
 Bactrocera curvosterna Drew & Romig, 2013
 Bactrocera dapsiles Drew, 1989
 Bactrocera daruensis Drew, 1989
 Bactrocera decumana (Drew, 1972)
 Bactrocera decurtans (May, 1965)
 Bactrocera diallagma Drew, 1989
 Bactrocera diaphana (Hering, 1953)
 Bactrocera digressa Radhakrishnan, 1999
 Bactrocera diospyri Drew, 1989
 Bactrocera dispar (Hardy, 1982)
 Bactrocera dongnaiae Drew & Romig, 2013
 Bactrocera dorsalis (Hendel, 1912)
 Bactrocera dorsaloides (Hardy & Adachi, 1954)
 Bactrocera dyscrita (Drew, 1971)
 Bactrocera ebenea (Drew, 1971)
 Bactrocera ektoalangiae Drew & Hancock, 1999
 Bactrocera elongata Drew & Romig, 2013
 Bactrocera endiandrae (Perkins & May, 1949)
 Bactrocera enochra (Drew, 1972)
 Bactrocera epicharis (Hardy, 1970)
 Bactrocera ernesti Leblanc & Doorenweerd, 2018
 Bactrocera erubescentis (Drew & Hancock, 1981)
 Bactrocera eurycosta Drew & Romig, 2013
 Bactrocera exigua (May, 1958)
 Bactrocera eximia Drew, 1989
 Bactrocera expandens (Walker, 1859)
 Bactrocera exspoliata (Hering, 1941)
 Bactrocera facialis (Coquillett, 1909)
 Bactrocera fagraea (Tryon, 1927)
 Bactrocera fastigata Tsuruta & White, 2001
 Bactrocera fergussoniensis Drew, 1989
 Bactrocera fernandoi Tsuruta & White, 2001
 Bactrocera finitima Drew, 1989
 Bactrocera flavinotus (May, 1957)
 Bactrocera flavipennis (Hardy, 1982)
 Bactrocera flavoscutellata Lin & Wang, 2005
 Bactrocera flavosterna Drew & Romig, 2013
 Bactrocera floresiae Drew & Hancock, 1994
 Bactrocera frauenfeldi (Schiner, 1868)
 Bactrocera froggatti (Bezzi, 1928)
 Bactrocera fuliginus (Drew & Hancock, 1981)
 Bactrocera fulvicauda (Perkins, 1939)
 Bactrocera fulvifacies (Perkins, 1939)
 Bactrocera fulvifemur Drew & Hancock, 1994
 Bactrocera fulvoabdominalis White & Evenhuis, 1999
 Bactrocera fulvosterna Drew & Romig 2013
 Bactrocera furcata David & Hancock 2017
 Bactrocera furfurosa Drew, 1989
 Bactrocera furvescens Drew, 1989
 Bactrocera furvilineata Drew, 1989
 Bactrocera fuscalata Drew, 1989
 Bactrocera fuscitibia Drew & Hancock, 1994
 Bactrocera fuscoformosa Drew & Romig, 2013
 Bactrocera fuscohumeralis White & Evenhuis, 1999
 Bactrocera fuscolobata Drew & Romig, 2013
 Bactrocera fuscoptera Drew & Romig, 2013
 Bactrocera garciniae Bezzi, 1913
 Bactrocera gnetum Drew & Hancock, 1995
 Bactrocera gombokensis Drew & Hancock, 1994
 Bactrocera grandifasciata White & Evenhuis, 1999
 Bactrocera grandistylus Drew & Hancock, 1995
 Bactrocera halfordiae (Tryon, 1927)
 Bactrocera halmaherae Drew & Romig, 2013
 Bactrocera hantanae Tsuruta & White, 2001
 Bactrocera harrietensis Ramani & David, 2016
 Bactrocera hastigerina (Hardy, 1954)
 Bactrocera hispidula (May, 1958)
 Bactrocera hollingsworthi Drew & Romig, 2001
 Bactrocera holtmanni (Hardy, 1974)
 Bactrocera humilis (Drew & Hancock, 1981)
 Bactrocera hyalina (Shiraki, 1933)
 Bactrocera hypomelaina Drew, 1989
 Bactrocera icelus (Hardy, 1974)
 Bactrocera illusioscutellaris Drew & Romig, 2013
 Bactrocera impunctata (de Mejeire, 1914)
 Bactrocera incompta Drew & Romig, 2013
 Bactrocera inconspicua Drew & Romig, 2013
 Bactrocera inconstans Drew, 1989
 Bactrocera indecora (Drew, 1971)
 Bactrocera indonesiae Drew & Hancock, 1994
 Bactrocera infulata Drew & Hancock, 1994
 Bactrocera invisitata Drew, 1989
 Bactrocera involuta (Hardy, 1982)
 Bactrocera irvingiae Drew & Hancock, 1994
 Bactrocera ismayi Drew, 1989
 Bactrocera jaceobancroftii Drew & Romig 2013
 Bactrocera jarvisi (Tryon, 1927)
 Bactrocera kalimantaniae Drew & Romig, 2013
 Bactrocera kanchanaburi Drew & Hancock, 1994
 Bactrocera kandiensis (Drew & Hancock, 1994)
 Bactrocera kelaena Drew, 1989
 Bactrocera kinabalu Drew & Hancock, 1994
 Bactrocera kirki (Froggatt, 1910)
 Bactrocera kohkongiae Leblanc, 2015
 Bactrocera kraussi (Hardy, 1951)
 Bactrocera kuniyoshii (Shiraki, 1968)
 Bactrocera laithieuiae Drew & Romig, 2013
 Bactrocera lampabilis (Drew, 1971)
 Bactrocera lata (Perkins, 1938)
 Bactrocera lateritaenia Drew & Hancock, 1994
 Bactrocera laticaudus (Hardy 1950)
 Bactrocera laticosta Drew, 1989
 Bactrocera latifrons (Hendel, 1915) - In 2016 found in Burundi, quickly investigated across the country, and found to have already spread to the entire country and possibly soon its neighbors.
 Bactrocera latilineata Drew, 1989
 Bactrocera latilineola Drew & Hancock, 1994
 Bactrocera latissima Drew, 1989
 Bactrocera limbifera (Bezzi, 1919)
 Bactrocera linduensis Drew & Romig, 2013
 Bactrocera lineata (Perkins, 1939)
 Bactrocera lombokensis Drew & Hancock, 1994
 Bactrocera longicornis Macquart, 1835
 Bactrocera lucida (Munro, 1939)
 Bactrocera luteola (Malloch, 1931)
 Bactrocera maculigera Doleschall, 1858
 Bactrocera makilingensis Drew & Hancock, 1994
 Bactrocera malaysiensis Drew & Hancock, 1994
 Bactrocera mamaliae Drew & Romig, 2013
 Bactrocera manskii (Perkins & May, 1949)
 Bactrocera matsumurai (Shiraki, 1933)
 Bactrocera mayi (Hardy, 1951)
 Bactrocera mcgregori (Bezzi, 1919)
 Bactrocera mediorufula Drew & Romig, 2013
 Bactrocera megaspilus (Hardy, 1982)
 Bactrocera melania (Hardy & Adachi, 1954)
 Bactrocera melanogaster Drew, 1989
 Bactrocera melanoscutata Drew, 1989
 Bactrocera melanothoracica Drew, 1989
 Bactrocera melanotus (Coquillett, 1909)
 Bactrocera melas (Perkins & May, 1949)
 Bactrocera melastomatos Drew & Hancock, 1994
 Bactrocera memnonia (Drew, 1989)
 Bactrocera menanus (Munro, 1984)
 Bactrocera mendosa (May, 1958)
 Bactrocera merapiensis Drew & Hancock, 1994
 Bactrocera mesomelas (Bezzi, 1908)
 Bactrocera mesonotochra Drew, 1989
 Bactrocera mimulus Drew, 1989
 Bactrocera minax (Enderlein, 1920)
 Bactrocera miniscula Drew & Hancock, 1994
 Bactrocera minuta (Drew, 1971)
 Bactrocera moluccensis (Perkins, 1939)
 Bactrocera montyanus (Munro, 1984)
 Bactrocera morobiensis Drew, 1989
 Bactrocera morula Drew, 1989
 Bactrocera mucronis (Drew, 1971)
 Bactrocera muiri (Hardy & Adachi, 1954)
 Bactrocera munroi (White, 1957)
 Bactrocera murrayi (Perkins, 1939)
 Bactrocera musae (Tryon, 1909)
 Bactrocera mutabilis (May, 1952)
 Bactrocera nanoarcuata Drew & Romig, 2013
 Bactrocera nationigrotibialis Drew & Romig, 2013
 Bactrocera naucleae Drew & Romig, 2001
 Bactrocera neoarecae Drew, 2002
 Bactrocera neocheesmanae Drew, 1989
 Bactrocera neocongnata Drew & Hancock, 1994
 Bactrocera neofulvicauda Drew & Romig, 2013
 Bactrocera neohumeralis (Hardy, 1951)
 Bactrocera neonigrita (Drew, 1989)
 Bactrocera neonigrotibialis Drew 2002
 Bactrocera neopropinqua Drew & Hancock, 1994
 Bactrocera neoritsemai Drew & Romig 2013
 Bactrocera neoxanthodes Drew & Romig, 2001
 Bactrocera nesiotes (Munro, 1984)
 Bactrocera nigella (Drew, 1968)
 Bactrocera nigra (Tryon, 1927)
 Bactrocera nigrescens (Drew, 1968)
 Bactrocera nigrescentis (Drew, 1971)
 Bactrocera nigricula (Drew, 1989)
 Bactrocera nigrifacia Zhang Ji & Chen, 2011
 Bactrocera nigrifemorata Li & Wang, 2011
 Bactrocera nigrita (Hardy, 1955)
 Bactrocera nigrivenata (Munro, 1937)
 Bactrocera nigrofemoralis White & Tsuruta, 2001
 Bactrocera nigroscutata White & Evenhuis, 1999
 Bactrocera nigrotibialis (Perkins, 1938)
 Bactrocera nigrovittata Drew, 1989
 Bactrocera notatagena (May, 1953)
 Bactrocera nothaphoebe Drew & Romig, 2013
 Bactrocera obfuscata Drew, 1989
 Bactrocera oblineata Drew, 1989
 Bactrocera obliqua (Malloch, 1939)
 Bactrocera obliquivenosa Drew & Romig, 2001
 Bactrocera obscura (Malloch, 1931)
 Bactrocera obscurata (de Mejeire, 1911)
 Bactrocera obscurivitta Drew & Romig, 2013
 Bactrocera occipitalis (Bezzi, 1919)
 Bactrocera ochracea Drew, 1989
 Bactrocera ochroma Drew & Romig, 2013
 Bactrocera ochromarginis (Drew, 1971)
 Bactrocera ochrosiae (Malloch, 1942)
 Bactrocera ochroventer Drew & Romig, 2013
 Bactrocera oleae (Rossi, 1790)
 Bactrocera opacovitta Drew & Romig, 2013
 Bactrocera opiliae (Drew & Hardy, 1981)
 Bactrocera osbeckiae Drew & Hancock, 1994
 Bactrocera pacificae Drew & Romig, 2001
 Bactrocera pagdeni (Malloch, 1939)
 Bactrocera pallescentis (Hardy, 1955)
 Bactrocera pallida (Perkins & May, 1949)
 Bactrocera paraarecae Drew & Romig, 2013
 Bactrocera parabancroftii Drew, 2011
 Bactrocera parabarringtoniae Drew & Hancock, 1999
 Bactrocera paradiospyri Chen Zhou & Li, 2011
 Bactrocera parafrauenfeldi Drew, 1989
 Bactrocera parafroggatti Drew & Romig, 2001
 Bactrocera paralatissima Drew & Romig, 2013
 Bactrocera paralimbifera Drew & Romig, 2013
 Bactrocera paramusae Drew, 1989
 Bactrocera paranigrita Drew & Romig, 2013
 Bactrocera paraosbeckiae Drew 2002
 Bactrocera paraverbascifoliae Drew, 2002
 Bactrocera paraxanthodes Drew & Hancock, 1995
 Bactrocera parvula (Hendel, 1912)
 Bactrocera passiflorae (Froggatt, 1910)
 Bactrocera patula Drew & Romig, 2013
 Bactrocera pectoralis (Walker, 1859)
 Bactrocera pedestris (Bezzi, 1913)
 Bactrocera pendleburyi (Perkins, 1938)
 Bactrocera peneallwoodi Drew & Romig, 2013
 Bactrocera penebeckerae Drew & Romig, 2013
 Bactrocera penecognata Drew & Hancock, 1994
 Bactrocera penecorrecta Drew, 2002
 Bactrocera penecostalis Drew & Romig, 2013
 Bactrocera penefurva Drew, 1989
 Bactrocera peneobscura Drew & Romig, 2001
 Bactrocera penephaea Drew & Romig, 2013
 Bactrocera peninsularis (Drew & Hancock, 1981)
 Bactrocera pepisalae (Froggatt, 1910)
 Bactrocera perfusca (Aubertin, 1929)
 Bactrocera perigrapha White & Tsuruta, 2001
 Bactrocera perkinsi (Drew & Hancock, 1981)
 Bactrocera pernigra Ito, 1983
 Bactrocera peterseni (Hardy, 1970)
 Bactrocera petila Drew, 1989
 Bactrocera phaea (Drew, 1971)
 Bactrocera phaleriae (May, 1956)
 Bactrocera picea (Drew, 1972)
 Bactrocera pictipennis Lin & Zeng 2011
 Bactrocera pisinna Drew, 1989
 Bactrocera popondettiensis Drew, 1989
 Bactrocera profunda Tsuruta & White, 2001
 Bactrocera prolixa Drew, 1989
 Bactrocera propedistincta Drew, 1989
 Bactrocera propinqua (Hardy & Adachi, 1954)
 Bactrocera pruniae Drew & Romig, 2013
 Bactrocera pseudobeckerae Drew & Romig, 2013
 Bactrocera pseudocucurbitae (White, 1999)
 Bactrocera pseudodistincta (Drew, 1971)
 Bactrocera pseudoversicolor Drew, 2002
 Bactrocera psidii (Froggatt, 1899)
 Bactrocera pulchra Tryon, 1927
 Bactrocera pusilla (Hardy, 1983)
 Bactrocera pyrifoliae Drew & Hancock, 1994
 Bactrocera quadrata (May, 1963)
 Bactrocera quadrisetosa (Bezzi, 1928)
 Bactrocera quasiinfulata Drew & Romig, 2013
 Bactrocera quasineonigrita Drew & Romig, 2013
 Bactrocera quasipropinqua Drew & Hancock, 1994
 Bactrocera quasisilvicola Drew, 1989
 Bactrocera raiensis Drew & Hancock, 1994
 Bactrocera ramuensis Drew, 2011
 Bactrocera ranganathi Drew & Romig, 2013
 Bactrocera reclinata Drew, 1989
 Bactrocera recurrens (Hering, 1941)
 Bactrocera redunca (Drew, 1971)
 Bactrocera repanda Drew, 1989
 Bactrocera resima (Drew, 1971)
 Bactrocera retrorsa Drew, 1989
 Bactrocera rhabdota Drew, 1989
 Bactrocera ritsemai (Weyenbergh, 1869)
 Bactrocera robertsi Drew, 1989
 Bactrocera robiginosa (May, 1958)
 Bactrocera romigae (Drew & Hancock, 1981)
 Bactrocera rubigina (Wang & Zhao, 1989)
 Bactrocera rufescens (May, 1967)
 Bactrocera rufivitta Drew 2011
 Bactrocera rufofuscula (Drew & Hancock, 1981)
 Bactrocera russeola (Drew & Hancock, 1981)
 Bactrocera rutengiae Drew & Romig, 2013
 Bactrocera rutila (Hering, 1941)
 Bactrocera samoae Drew, 1989
 Bactrocera sapaensis Drew & Romig, 2013
 Bactrocera satanellus (Hering, 1941)
 Bactrocera seguyi (Hering, 1939)
 Bactrocera selenophora Tsuruta & White, 2001
 Bactrocera sembaliensis Drew & Hancock, 1994
 Bactrocera setinervis (Malloch, 1938)
 Bactrocera silvicola (May, 1962)
 Bactrocera simulata (Malloch, 1939)
 Bactrocera speculifer (Walker, 1865)
 Bactrocera speewahensis Fay & Hancock, 2006
 Bactrocera splendida (Perkins, 1938)
 Bactrocera strigata (Perkins, 1934)
 Bactrocera sulawesiae Drew & Hancock, 1994
 Bactrocera suliae Drew & Romig, 2013
 Bactrocera sumbawaensis Drew & Hancock, 1994
 Bactrocera superba Drew & Romig, 2013
 Bactrocera symplocos Drew & Romig, 2013
 Bactrocera syzygii White & Tsuruta, 2001
 Bactrocera ttapahensis Drew & Romig, 2013
 Bactrocera tenuifascia (May, 1965)
 Bactrocera terminaliae Drew, 1989
 Bactrocera terminifer (Walker, 1860)
 Bactrocera ternatiae Drew & Romig, 2013
 Bactrocera tetrachaeta (Bezzi, 1919)
 Bactrocera thailandica Drew & Hancock, 1994
 Bactrocera thistletoni Drew, 1989
 Bactrocera tigrina (May, 1953)
 Bactrocera tillyardi (Perkins, 1938)
 Bactrocera tinomiscii Drew, 1989
 Bactrocera torresiae Huxam & Hancock, 2006
 Bactrocera tortuosa White & Evenhuis, 1999
 Bactrocera toxopeusi (Hering, 1953)
 Bactrocera trifaria (Drew, 1971)
 Bactrocera trifasciata (Hardy, 1982)
 Bactrocera trilineola Drew, 1989
 Bactrocera trilobata Drew & Hancock, 2016
 Bactrocera trivialis (Drew, 1971)
 Bactrocera truncata Drew & Romig, 2013
 Bactrocera tryoni (Froggatt, 1897)
 Bactrocera tsuneonis (Miyake, 1919)
 Bactrocera tuberculata (Bezzi, 1916)
 Bactrocera turneri Drew, 1989
 Bactrocera umbrosa (Fabricius, 1805)
 Bactrocera unifasciata (Malloch, 1939)
 Bactrocera unilineata Drew, 1989
 Bactrocera unimacula Drew & Hancock, 1994
 Bactrocera unipunctata (Malloch, 1939)
 Bactrocera unistriata (Drew, 1971)
 Bactrocera unitaeniola Drew & Romig, 2001
 Bactrocera usitata Drew & Hancock, 1994
 Bactrocera ustulata Drew, 1989
 Bactrocera uvariae Drew, 2011
 Bactrocera venefica (Hering, 1938)
 Bactrocera verbascifoliae Drew & Hancock, 1994
 Bactrocera versicolor (Bezzi, 1916)
 Bactrocera visenda (Hardy, 1951)
 Bactrocera vishnu Drew & Hancock, 1994
 Bactrocera vulgaris (Drew, 1971)
 Bactrocera waaiae Drew & Romig, 2013
 Bactrocera wanangiae Drew & Hancock, 2016
 Bactrocera warisensis White & Evenhuis, 1999
 Bactrocera wuzhishana Li & Wang, 2006
 Bactrocera xanthodes (Broun, 1904)
 Bactrocera yayeyamana (Matsumara, 1916)
 Bactrocera yorkensis Drew & Hancock, 1999
 Bactrocera zonata (Saunders, 1842)

References

 after Fruit Fly (Diptera: Tephritidae) Species Database from 2006-12-22

Bactrocera